Raymond Evans may refer to:
 Raymond Evans (architect), see Clifford Percy Evans
 Raymond Evans (director), films included 1943's Hemp for Victory
 Raymond Evans (field hockey), Australian field hockey player
 Raymond T. Evans, a state legislator in Delaware
 Raymond Evans (USCG), United States Coast Guard sailor
 Raymond Evans (writer), co-author of Radical Brisbane: An Unruly History, see Carole Ferrier

See also
 Ray Evans (disambiguation)